Carl Bohm (also known as Henry Cooper [pseudonym] and Karl Bohm) (11 September 1844 – 4 April 1920) was a German pianist and composer.

Bohm is regarded as one of the leading German songwriters of the 19th century, and wrote such works as Still as the Night, Twilight, May Bells, Enfant Cheri and The Fountain.

According to the Oxford Companion to Music, Bohm was "a German composer of great fecundity and the highest salability... He occupied an important position in the musical commonwealth inasmuch as his publisher, N. Simrock, declared that the profits on his compositions provided the capital for the publication of those of Brahms." Bohm's specialty was music in a lighter vein, very different from the dark, brooding and introspective works of Brahms.

Bohm, like Schubert, was more than just a songwriter, composing in most genres. His chamber music, mostly quartets and piano trios, were popular not only amongst amateurs, but also among touring professional groups who were in need of a sure-fire audience pleaser.

Edition Silvertrust (see references) states that Bohm "was certainly very well known during his lifetime. Yet today, his name brings nothing but blank stares." This curious obscurity is borne out more than ever by the fact that Grove Dictionary of Music and Musicians contains no article about him.  Nonetheless, his Sarabande in G minor remains a standard teaching piece for intermediate violinists and violists.

Selected works

 Lieder (op. 326; including Nr. 27: "Still wie die Nacht“)
 Salon-Kompositionen (op. 327)
 Klaviertrio G-dur. (Forelle; op. 330 Nr.2)
 Perpetuo Mobile (Kleine Suite 6)
 Introduction and Polonaise
 Moto Perpetuo
 Hausmusik
 Spanischer Tanz
 The Fountain (op. 221) (G major)
 Op.99 Petit Rondeau Brillant (G major)
 Op.102 La Zingana - Hungarian Mazurka
 Op.114 No.5 Sextet From Lucia (Donizetti)
 Op.135 May Bells
 Op.213 Charge of the Uhlans - Grand Galop Militaire Op.266 If Thou Thy Heart Wilt Give Me - Melodie Op.270 Song of the Swallow Op.281 Fairy Dance Op.282 Frolic of the Butterflies - Kosender Falter Op.302 No.5 La Grace Op.305 No.b2 The Dance Queen - Polonaise Op.327 No.14 Seguidilla - Spanish Song Op.357 No.3 Brise printaniere - Polka brillante Op.357 No.4 Rosetta - Fantasie-Mazurka Op.362 No.1 Soldaten kommen (Soldiers are Coming) March Sarabande in G minor for solo violin''

Notes and references

 Some of the information on this page appears on the website of Edition Silvertrust but permission has been granted to copy, distribute and/or modify this document under the terms of the GNU Free Documentation License.

External links

 

Some of Bohm's violin pieces are available at Free violin music

1844 births
1920 deaths
19th-century German musicians
19th-century German male musicians
20th-century German male musicians
German Romantic composers
German male classical composers